Aniceto Porsisoca (born Carlos Álvarez Pineda) (February 24, 1928.-June 9, 1993) was a Salvadorean comedian.

Biography
Porsisoca was born in Santa Ana, El Salvador. At age 14, Porsisoca enrolled in the Escuela Normal de Maestros de San Salvador with the goal of becoming a teacher.  After leaving school temporarily due to his father's death, Porsisoca eventually became a teacher.

Early in his career, Porsisoca worked on radio as a comedic narrator alongside Paco Medina Funes. He also appeared on television Shows such as Las Puntadas de Aniceto), in comic books and magazines.

Porsisoca was declared Hijo Meritísimo de El Salvador for his contributions to the national arts.  He died on June 9, 1993 due to throat cancer.

Personal life
Porsisoca was married to a woman that he referred to "La Peche" (The Skinny Woman) in his act.  His dog's name was "Huracán" Porsisoca bragged that his dog was so obedient that he once urged the dog to attack someone by yelling "Huracán, ataque" (Attack, Huracán).  In responsem Huracán fell to the floor with a heart attack.

Quotes
Aniceto contributed phrases to the Salvadorean vocabulary such as:
"Uno de cipote es tonto" (one is dumb when young).
"Esto no lo venden en la tienda de la esquina, solo Dios lo da," (They don't sell this at the corner store, only God can give it) which he would often say while tapping on his forehead and referring to his intelligence.
"Yo te lo dije, Chele" (I told you, Whitey) -  Referring to his comedy partner Paco Medina Funes (and later Rey "El Chele" Ávila), who played the straight man in the comedic duo.
"El fisico me compromete" (My physical appearance gets me in trouble).

References

Male comedians
1928 births
1993 deaths
Salvadoran entertainers